The House of Monymusk is located on the outskirts of the Scottish village of Monymusk, in the Marr region of Aberdeenshire. The house is located near the River Don, which is known for its spectacular trout-fishing. The village, which history dates back to 1170, was bought by the Forbses in the 1560s, who later built the House of Monymusk. The Forbses claim they built the present House of Monymusk from the blackened stones of the old Priory.

References

Category A listed buildings in Aberdeenshire
Inventory of Gardens and Designed Landscapes